The Indian Shaker Church and Gulick Homestead are an ensemble of historic buildings in The Dalles, Oregon, United States. Built by Henry Gulick directly on the Columbia riverbank in the 1890s, it is the only remaining 19th century fishing homestead in Oregon. Gulick, an employee of the locally-important Seufert salmon canning concern, included a church building in the complex in ca. 1896 for his wife, Harriet, a member of the Wasco people. The church was the smallest of five Indian Shaker Church congregations in the state.

The church and homestead were added to the National Register of Historic Places in 1978.

Bibliography 
 Gary Reinoehl, Susan W. Horton: Preliminary Survey of the Gulick Homestead/Indian Shaker Church (Lone Pine Island Site), in: Northwest Anthropological Research Notes 11,2 (Fall 1977), pp. 146–157.

See also
National Register of Historic Places listings in Wasco County, Oregon
Indian Shaker Church (Marysville, Washington)

References

External links

1891 establishments in Oregon
Buildings and structures in The Dalles, Oregon
National Register of Historic Places in Wasco County, Oregon
Churches on the National Register of Historic Places in Oregon
Churches in Wasco County, Oregon
Churches completed in 1896
Native American history of Oregon